The spitzer bullet (or spire point) is a pointed projectile that is primarily used in small-arms. The pointed nose shape, which was developed for military purposes in the late 19th and early 20th century, was a major design improvement compared to earlier rounder or flatter-tipped bullets because pointed nose shapes were less susceptible to external ballistic factors like drag.  By adding a point, projectiles made for fully-powered and intermediate rifle cartridges obtain a lower drag coefficient, which makes them decelerate less rapidly. Lowering the drag coefficient leads to improved external ballistic behaviour.

The development of spitzer bullets and long-range volley sights for service rifles changed military doctrines. Area targets at ranges up to  could be subject to rifle fire. The indirect firing method exploits the maximal effective range, that is defined by the maximum range of a small-arms projectile while still maintaining the minimum kinetic energy required to put unprotected personnel out of action, which is generally believed to be 15 kilogram-meters (147 J / 108 ft⋅lbf).

Spitzer bullets greatly increased the lethality of the battlefields of World War I. Before, during and after World War I, militaries adopted aerodynamically even more refined spitzer projectiles by combining a pointed nose shape with a slightly tapered base at the rear, called a boat tail, which further reduced drag in flight.

Etymology

The name "spitzer" is an anglicized form of the German word Spitzgeschoss, literally meaning "pointed projectile".

History

Design requirements
By the middle to the end of the 19th century, European military research had started to examine how to maximise available small arms muzzle velocity through improved projectile design. Stronger metal casing were being used to contain cartridge propellants making small arms more powerful but not anymore accurate. Designers knew that by making bullets with a lower drag coefficient (Cd) they decelerate less rapidly and therefore will travel much further. A lower drag coefficient also flattens the projectile's trajectory making it more stable in flight and less susceptible to lateral drift caused by crosswinds. By retaining a higher impact velocity, bullets with high ballistic coefficients would retain more kinetic energy and be lethal at greater ranges. It was these requirements that drove military thinking in the years prior to the First World War.

1898

France
The spitzer bullet design was first introduced in 1898 as the Balle D by the French Army. The Balle D bullet  was designed by Captain Georges Raymond Desaleux, in order to improve the ballistic performance of the existing French 8×50mmR Lebel service cartridge of 1886.

The original 1886 pattern 8×50mmR Lebel cartridge was an innovative service cartridge design, since it was the first military cartridge to use single-base smokeless, nitrocellulose based, (Poudre B) gunpowder as developed by Paul Vieille in 1884.

Besides having a pointed nose section the Balle D was also the first military rifle projectile that had a boat tail – a streamlined tapered base – to further minimize air resistance in flight.

Downrange performance
The 1898 pattern 8×50mmR Lebel Balle D spitzer nose profile combined with the boat tail resulted in a ballistic coefficient (G1 BC) of 0.568 to 0.581 (ballistic coefficients are somewhat debatable). Even by 21st century standards  typical effective supersonic range is regarded as normal for a standard military rifle round.

The above downrange performance tables show the superior velocity retention of the Balle D compared with its Balle M predecessor
Note: The air density ρ used to correlate these tables is unknown.

In 1932 8×50mmR Lebel Balle N ammunition was introduced, which featured a lead-cored, cupro-nickel-over-steel-jacketed, pointed boat-tail bullet weighing 15.0 g (232 grains). It had been designed to improve the long-range performance of the issued Hotchkiss Mle 1914 machine guns.

1902–1918

German Empire

In Germany the Gewehr-Prüfungskommission (G.P.K.) (Rifle Testing Commission) was responsible for improving the accuracy and performance of the 1888 pattern military M/88 ammunition and Germany's weapons chambered for M/88 ammunition like the Gewehr 1888. During a late 19th and early 20th century improvement program tasked with remedying the M/88's propellant compression and excessive barrel (grooves) wear problems, the German ordnance authority began to prefer spitzer bullets by 1898.

A new Spitzgeschoß aerodynamic bullet, credited to the independent ballistician Arthur Gleinich, was tested in 1902 and officially adopted on 3 April 1903. After several shape revisions it entered mass production in 1904. The Spitzgeschoß nose was externally pointed like the French design and its shape was patented, but the full metal jacket Spitzgeschoß differed internally. The combination of increased muzzle velocity and improved bullet aerodynamics provided a much flatter bullet trajectory, which increased the probability of hitting an individual target at most typical combat distances.

At the onset of World War I, Germany developed an aerodynamically further refined bullet. This  full metal jacket s.S. (schweres Spitzgeschoß, "heavy spitzer") boat tail projectile had a ballistic coefficient (G1 BC) of 0.557 to 0.593 (ballistic coefficients are somewhat debatable) and was loaded in the s.S. Patrone. From its 1914 introduction the s.S. Patrone was mainly issued for aerial combat and as of 1918 in the later stages of World War I to infantry machine gunners. Fifteen years after World War I the S Patrone was phased out and the s.S. Patrone became the standard issue ball ammunition for the German military.

United States

In 1906, United States ordnance authorities arranged to purchase the production license for the Spitzgeschoß bullet design from Gleinich. Now referred to as a 'spitzer' design, the new  flat base projectile that had a ballistic coefficient (G1 BC) of approximately 0.405 with a cupro-nickel alloy jacket was incorporated into the M1906 .30-06 Springfield cartridge adopted by U.S. armed forces in 1906. The cupro-nickel alloy was found to foul the bore quickly.

Russian Empire
In 1908 the Russian Empire adopted a new 7.62×54mmR service round variant loaded with the "L"  Лёгкая Пуля (Lyogkhaya pulya, "Light Bullet") spitzer bullet that had a ballistic coefficient (G1 BC) of approximately 0.338.

United Kingdom of Great Britain and Ireland
In 1910 the United Kingdom of Great Britain and Ireland officially adopted the .303 British Mark VII cartridge variant loaded with an  flat base spitzer bullet that had a ballistic coefficient (G1 BC) of approximately 0.467.

Switzerland

In 1911 Switzerland adopted the 7.5×55mm GP 11 cartridge loaded with a  spitzer full metal jacket bullet. Besides a pointed nose, the GP 11 bullet also had a boat tail to further lower the drag coefficient (Cd). The GP 11 bullet set off the militaries of countries like Germany, the United States and the United Kingdom at the onset of and after World War I to develop and field similar full metal jacket boat tail spitzer bullets to improve the maximum effective range and long range performance of the full metal jacket flat based spitzer bullet designs they used. The useful maximum effective range is defined by the maximum range of a small-arms projectile while still maintaining the minimum kinetic energy required to put unprotected personnel out of action, which is generally believed to be 15 kilogram-meters (147 J / 108 ft⋅lbf).

Kingdom of Spain
In 1913 the ordnance authorities of the Kingdom of Spain issued a redesigned 7×57mm Mauser cartridge (7mm Cartucho para Mauser Tipo S).

Post-World War I

Sweden
In 1932 Sweden introduced the 8×63mm patron m/32 loaded with  spitzer bullets with a boat tail fired at a muzzle velocity of  bullets.

Besides a pointed nose the m/41 D-projectile also had a boat tail.

References

External links 
 

Bullets